The Los Angeles Theatre Ensemble is a theatre troupe based in Los Angeles, California. It was founded in 2004 by a group of actors, designers and directors including artistic director Tom Burmester.  The Ensemble states its mission is "to strike a balance between providing a venue for emerging artists and veteran artists; between the works of new playwrights, and revisiting timely and important classics."

Productions

On 3 August 2005, the Ensemble opened the production Wounded an original collaborative work based on the testament of wounded veterans returning from the Iraq War.

2010 Season

 In the Company of Jane Doe, Written by Tiffany Antone, Directed by Mary Jo DuPrey
 A Giant Arc in the Skyspace of Directions, Written by Michael Vukadinovich, Directed by Efrain Schunior
 Trog and Clay, Written by Michael Vukadinovich, Directed by Gary Gardner
 A Midsummer Night's Dream, Directed by Jonathan Redding
 The War Cycle:  Wounded, Written by Tom Burmester and the Ensemble, Directed by Tom Burmester
 The War Cycle:  Nation of Two, Written by Tom Burmester, Directed by Danika Sudik
 The War Cycle:  Gospel According to First Squad, Written by Tom Burmester, Directed by Danika Sudik
 The Good Prisoner, Written by Kit Steinkellner, Directed by Louise Hung

2009 Season

 Macbeth, Directed by Jonathan Redding
 Survived, Directed by Tom Burmester and Danika Sudik and written by Tom Burmester
 The Heretic Mysteries, Written and Directed by David Bridel
 Monkey Madness, Written and Directed by Daisuke Tsuji. Winner of LA Weekly Award for Best Puppetry, Nominated for seven LA Weekly Awards.
 Adeline's Play, Directed by Amanda Glaze and written by Kit Steinkellner
 Beau Fib, Directed by Andy Goldblatt, Book and Lyrics by Myles Nye, Composed by John Graney & Andy Hentz

2008 Season

 I Gelosi, Written and Directed by David Bridel
 Spring's Awakening, Written by Frank Wedekind, adapted by Tom Burmester and Evan Drane, Directed by Evan Drane
 Quixotic, Written by Kit Steinkeller, directed by Amanda Glaze

2007 Season

 The Water Engine by David Mamet directed by Tom Burmester
 Wounded by Tom Burmester directed by Tom Burmester 
 Ran Wild by Rose Martula 

2006 Season

 The Island by Athol Fugard - LA Theatre Ensemble (2006)
 Wounded by Tom Burmester directed by Tom Burmester
 Stone Cold Dead Serious by Adam Rapp directed by Larry Errick
 The Distance from Here by Neil LaBute directed by Theo Perkins

2005 Season

 Kindred by Daniel Keleher directed by Tom Burmester
 The Wounded Project by the Ensemble directed by Tom Burmester

At the 2010 LA Weekly Theatre Awards the Ensemble and Artistic Director Tom Burmester were awarded with a Special Citation for Excellence and Breadth of Vision for their work on The War Cycle.

External links

 Cover Story in LA WEEKLY

2004 establishments in California
Theatre companies in Los Angeles
Performing groups established in 2004